Perry A. Frey (born 1935) is professor emeritus of biochemistry at the University of Wisconsin–Madison. He was elected to the National Academy of Sciences in 1998. Research in his laboratory centered on the elucidation of enzymatic reaction mechanisms.

Early life and education
Frey was born in Plain City, Ohio in 1935. He served in the military for two years before attending Ohio State University, where he earned his B.S. degree in chemistry in 1959. Frey earned his Ph.D. in biochemistry from Brandeis University in 1968.

Career
During the time between his undergraduate and graduate studies, Frey worked for the Public Health Service. After earning his Ph.D., he worked as a postdoctoral fellow for enzymologist Frank Westheimer at Harvard University. Frey then secured a faculty position in the Chemistry Department at the Ohio State University. He held that position for several years, but in 1981 he joined the faculty at the Institute for Enzyme Research (now a part of the Biochemistry Department) at the University of Wisconsin-Madison.

Partial bibliography

Honors and awards
1995 - Alexander von Humboldt Senior Scientist Award
1998 - Elected to the National Academy of Sciences
1998 - American Chemical Society Division of Biological Chemistry's Repligen Corporation Award in Chemistry of Biological Processes
2003 - Fellow of the American Academy of Arts and Sciences
2003 - Fellow of the American Association for the Advancement of Science
2007 - Hilldale Award

References

External links
Frey Group webpage
Frey et al publications on PubMed

Living people
Ohio State University College of Arts and Sciences alumni
American biochemists
Members of the United States National Academy of Sciences
Brandeis University alumni
1935 births
University of Wisconsin–Madison faculty
People from Plain City, Ohio